"Henry" Ho Wai Kun (born January 12, 1982) is a racing driver from Macau.

Career
Ho won the Macau Touring Car Championship in 2005, 2008 and 2009. He also won the ST4 class of the Japanese Super Taikyu series in 2006, and finished third in the main ST1 class in 2007. In 2008 he competed in the Asian Touring Car Championship.

He raced in the World Touring Car Championship for Engstler Motorsport at the final two rounds of the 2009 season in Japan and Macau.

He lists his hobbies as wakeboarding, shopping and sleeping.

Career results

Complete World Touring Car Championship results
(key) (Races in bold indicate pole position) (Races in italics indicate fastest lap)

References

Living people
1982 births
Macau racing drivers
World Touring Car Championship drivers

TCR Asia Series drivers
Asian Touring Car Championship drivers
Engstler Motorsport drivers